The 2007–08 Copa Venezuela was the 38th staging of the Copa Venezuela.

The competition started on August 29, 2007, and concluded on April 16, 2008, with a two leg final, in which Aragua FC won the trophy for the first time with a 2–2 draw and a 0–0 at home over Unión Atlético Maracaibo.

First round
The matches were played on 29 August 2007.

|}

Second round
One leg - 2A/2B Division Teams v/s 1 Division Teams. The matches were played on 8–9 September 2007.

|}

Two legs - 1 Division Teams v/s 1 Division Teams. The matches were played on 9–12 September 2007.

|}

Third round
The matches were played on 19–26 September 2007.

|}

Quarterfinals
The matches were played on 10–14 October 2007.

|}

Semifinals
The matches were played on 31 October–18 November 2007 and 5–19 March 2008.

|}

Finals
The matches were played on 2–16 April 2008.

|}

Aragua FC winners, qualify to Copa Nissan Suramericana 2008.

External links
RSSSF.com

Copa Venezuela
2007–08 domestic association football cups
2007–08 in Venezuelan football